The canton of Saint-Maur-des-Fossés-2 is an administrative division of the Val-de-Marne department, Île-de-France region, northern France. It was created at the French canton reorganisation which came into effect in March 2015. Its seat is in Saint-Maur-des-Fossés.

It consists of the following communes:
Bonneuil-sur-Marne
Ormesson-sur-Marne
Saint-Maur-des-Fossés (partly)
Sucy-en-Brie

References

Cantons of Val-de-Marne